Nick Saul (born August 9, 1966) is a Canadian food and social justice activist, author, and the President and CEO of Community Food Centres Canada. Nick is also the Chancellor of Victoria University in the University of Toronto.

Early life 
Saul was born in Tanzania where his parents taught and studied at the University of East Africa in Dar es Salaam, and were active in the liberation struggles of the Southern African states. The family moved back to Canada in 1972. Saul completed his undergraduate studies in history at University of Toronto and his master's studies in sociology at Warwick University in the UK, where he was a Commonwealth Scholar.

Career 
After graduating in 1993, Saul became a community organizer, working with public housing tenants in Alexandra Park (the first conversion of a public housing community into a co-operative in Canada) and homeless men on the east side of Toronto.

In 1998, Saul became Executive Director of The Stop Community Food Centre. During his tenure at the organization, he and staff transformed it from a small, under-resourced food bank to a thriving, internationally respected Community Food Centre offering programs in the areas of food access, food skills, and education and engagement.

In September 2012, Saul left The Stop with a group of colleagues to launch Community Food Centres Canada (CFCC). CFCC is a national organization that provides resources to partner organizations across Canada to establish Community Food Centres. Community Food Centres provide access to healthy food, food skills, community gardening, and policy advocacy for greater equity and justice. 

As of June 2020, there are thirteen Community Food Centres across Canada in Toronto, Perth, Stratford, Winnipeg, Dartmouth, Calgary, Hamilton., Eel Ground First Nation, Montreal, Kamloops, Nelson, Iqaluit, and Birch Lake. CFCC also works with organizations within the broader food movement to advocate for a fair food system.

Awards 

 Jane Jacobs' Prize, 2008
 The Golden Jubilee Medal, 2012
 Honorary Doctor of Laws degree, Faculty of Community Services, Ryerson University, 2016
 Order of Canada, 2019
 Arrell Global Food Innovation Award (awarded to CFCC)

Works

The Stop 
In 2013, Saul and his wife, Andrea Curtis, published The Stop: How the Fight for Good Food Transformed a Community and Inspired a Movement with Random House. The book was also published by Melville House in the U.S. The book details how Saul transformed The Stop from a food bank to a community hub, and how this transformation became the catalyst for a national Community Food Centre program. Saul and Curtis use this experience to argue the need for an overhaul of the food charity system to one rooted in food justice that empowers low-income communities. The book received multiple accolades including:

 Finalist, OLA Evergreen Award, 2014
 Finalist, Toronto Book Awards, 2014
 Finalist, Heritage Toronto Award, 2014
 Winner, Taste Canada Awards: English-language Culinary Narratives Category, 2014

References

External links 
 Community Food Centres Canada
 Nick Saul at TEDxToronto
 Article archive at The Huffington Post

Video 
 Nick Saul and Andrea Curtis, The Stop  — interview with the City of Toronto
 Nick Saul: Food with dignity — interview with Steve Paikan, The Agenda, TVO
 Nick Saul: Health happens when you fight for it  — Walrus Talks

1966 births
Living people
University of Toronto alumni
Alumni of the University of Warwick
Tanzanian emigrants to Canada
Canadian activists
Canadian non-fiction writers